"Mortimer Gray's History of Death" is a science fiction novella published in 1995 by Brian Stableford.  It was nominated for the 1996 Nebula Award for Best Novella. The story takes place in an updated version of Stableford's 1985 future history, The Third Millennium: A History of the World AD 2000-3000.

Plot summary
The story follows Mortimer Gray, a man who has extended his life for several hundred years.  It begins as Mortimer is involved in a ship wreck and narrowly escapes death.  This experience prompts him to write several volumes about the subject of death and humanity's war with it.  The novella is divided into several small chapters which alternatively describe the adventures of Mortimer's life and the reactions of the public to his latest volume of The History of Death.

References

External links 
 

1995 short stories
British speculative fiction works
Speculative fiction novellas
Works originally published in Asimov's Science Fiction